Moussa Ballo (born 11 January 1996) is a Malian footballer who plays as a left-back for Real Bamako and the Mali national team.

International career
Ballo made his professional debut with the Mali national team in a 2–0 2020 African Nations Championship qualification win over Mauritania on 20 October 2019.

External links
 
 NFT Profile

References

1993 births
Living people
Sportspeople from Bamako
Malian footballers
Mali international footballers
Association football fullbacks
Malian Première Division players
Malian expatriate footballers
Malian expatriate sportspeople in Morocco
Expatriate footballers in Morocco
21st-century Malian people
Mali A' international footballers
2020 African Nations Championship players
AS Real Bamako players